Sharad Sharma is an Indian cartoonist based in New Delhi, India. He was associated with many newspapers and magazines before he switched to electronic media and introduced political animation to Indian TV news channels. In the late 1990s, he formed the organisation World Comics India to introduce the idea of grassroots comics. The idea was to take this new communication medium to the masses. He took the art of cartooning and comics to the rural hinterland of India and other South Asian countries. He has extensive experience from workshops with a variety of organisations in India and internationally. His cartoon strip Developmentoon has been published in several newspapers and websites internationally. He has also published several books and manuals.

Since 2006 he has been helping small organisations working in remote areas to initiate social campaigns using grassroots comics on issues like infanticide, foeticide, corporal punishment and paedophilia.

Awards
He received the Karmaveer Puraskaar Noble Laureates, 2009 in the "Social Communication and Campaign Strategist" sub-category.

He received the Real Heroes Award by CNN IBN & Reliance Industries, 2008.

He was awarded Ashoka-Innovators for Public, Fellowship, 2005

References

Sydsvenskan, Malmo, Sweden https://web.archive.org/web/20100812142805/http://www.sydsvenskan.se/kultur-och-nojen/article563119/Budskapet-ar-viktigast.html
 The Communication Initiative Network http://www.comminit.com/en/node/309556/348
Zee News http://www.zeenews.com/news613520.html
 India Today http://networkedblogs.com/p21886497
 zeenews.com http://www.zeenews.com/news614522.html
Article Title

External links
World Comics
Khemka Foundation 
Promote Use of Comics for Social Good with Web Design, Research, Communication Skills - Fellow Sharad Sharma, Ashoka: Innovators for the Public
Comic Relief: This artist is animated by change, CNN-IBN Real Hereos

Indian cartoonists
Living people
People from New Delhi
Year of birth missing (living people)